Glenfawn is an unincorporated community in Rusk County, located in the U.S. state of Texas. According to the Handbook of Texas, the community had a population of 16 in 2000. It is located within the Longview, Texas metropolitan area.

History
Glenfawn may have been named by Julien Sidney Devereux, who owned the Monte Verdi Plantation and lived here before the American Civil War, or to commemorate a fawn being killed in the area by Ellis Glenn or Glen Garland. A post office was established at Glenfawn in 1872, and remained in operation until 1955, with Charles L. Nunally as postmaster. Mail was then sent to the community from Cushing. It remained a farming community for most of its history. Cotton was the most common crop shipped from Henderson. 250 people were living in Glenfawn in 1884 and were served by a steam-powered sawmill, a church, a doctor, a wagonmaker, gristmills, cotton gins, and general stores. B.B. Lyles and W. B. Harper both served as justice of the peace. Glenfawn had three churches and between 250 and 400 residents in 1890. It went down to 150 in 1914, grew to 260 from 1925 through the mid-1940s, then dropped again to 16 from 1968 through 2000.

Geography

Education
Glenfawn had its own school in 1884. Today, the community is served by the Laneville Independent School District.

Notes

Unincorporated communities in Cherokee County, Texas
Unincorporated communities in Texas